CVZ may refer to 
 Continuous Viewing Zone (Hubble Space Telescope; US NASA),
 Central Volcanic Zone (geology; see Andean Volcanic Belt).